Lee Buchanan (born March 9, 1961) is an American college basketball coach and the current women's head coach at LaGrange College.

Career
He is the former women's head coach at Eastern Illinois University in Charleston, Illinois. After leading his team to the Eastern Division title of the Ohio Valley Conference and an invitation to play in the WNIT in his first season at EIU, on April 15, 2013, Buchanan suddenly announced his resignation to "pursue other professional opportunities" and to spend more time with his family.

Head coaching record

References

External links
LaGrange Panthers bio

1961 births
Living people
American women's basketball coaches
Eastern Illinois Panthers women's basketball coaches
Eastern Illinois University alumni
Murray State University alumni
Southern Miss Lady Eagles basketball coaches
UMSL Tritons coaches
Francis Marion Patriots women's basketball coaches
Brescia University